This article is about a list of beaches in São Tomé and Príncipe.

São Tomé

Praia dos Tamarinos
Praia das Conchas
Praia Guegue
Praia Samérica
Praia da Mutamba
Praia das Plancas
Praia Grande
Praia de Rosema
Praia das Furnas
Praia da Moça
Praia do Fogo
Praia de Santa Catarina
Praia Capito
Praia da Palma
Praia da Pipa
Praia da Lança
Praia Sambangombe
Praia do Portinho
Praia Xixi
Praia Vá Inhá
Praia Jalé
Praia da Piscina
Praia Inhame
Praia Istanga (Ponta Cavingui)
Praia Istanga (Ponta Baleia)
Praia Micondo
Praia de Monte Mário
Praia Grande
Praia Zongonhin
Praia da Mandioca
Praia de Diogo Afonso
Praia Capitango
Praia Pesqueira
Praia da Azeitona
Praia Ió Grande
Praia do Gato
Praia Angobó
Praia de Angra Toldo
Praia da Colónia Açoriana
Praia do Morrão
Praia do Rei
Praia do Amador
Praia Congo
Praia do Almoxarife
Praia das Pombas
Praia do Melão
Praia do Lagarto
Praia da Nazaré
Praia Gamboa
Praia da Cruz
Praia Còracòra
Praia Mussacavu
Praia Martins Mendez
Praia Picão
Praia de Algés
Praia Micoló
Praia Fernão Dias
Praia Sete Ondas

Príncipe
Praia de Santa Rita
Praia da Ribeira Izé
Praia Pequena
Praia Iõla
Prainha (Ilha do Príncipe)
Praia do Caixão
Praia Formiga
Praia de São Tomé
Praia Seca
Praia Grande
Praia de Cabinda
Praia do Boi
Praia Periguito
Praia Évora
Praia do Inhame
Praia das Bananas
Praia das Burras

Ilhéu das Rolas
Praia Pesqueira
Praia do Pombo
Praia da Escada
Praia de Santo António

References
 GEOnet Names Server
Ezilon.com maps, 2009

Geography of São Tomé and Príncipe
Sao Tome and Principe
Beaches